The 2022–23 BYU Cougars men's basketball team represent Brigham Young University in the current 2022–23 NCAA Division I men's basketball season. It is head coach Mark Pope's fourth season as BYU's head coach and the Cougars 12th and last season as members of the West Coast Conference (WCC) as they will begin as members of the Big 12 Conference in the 2023–24 season. The Cougars play their home games at the Marriott Center in Provo, Utah.

Previous season 

The Cougars finished the 2021–22 season 24–11, 9–6 in WCC play to finish in fifth place. In the WCC tournament, they defeated Loyola Marymount in the second round before losing to San Francisco in the quarterfinals. BYU received an at-large bid to the National Invitation Tournament as a No. 2 seed. They defeated Long Beach State and Northern Iowa before losing in the quarterfinals to Washington State.

Offseason

Coaching changes 
On April 13, it was reported that then BYU assistant coach Chris Burgess had accepted a position as assistant coach at the University of Utah. Some possible expected candidates to replace Burgess included Mark Madsen (Utah Valley head coach), Kahil Fennell (former Louisville assistant), Dave Rice (former UNLV head coach), and Paul Peterson (Wasatch Academy head coach). On May 11, it was reported that Kahil Fennell was expected to fill the position. Two weeks later on May 26, Mark Pope announced that Kahil Fennell had been hired as the new assistant coach.

Departures 
Four scholarship players from the 2021–22 season graduated at the end of the year. Graduates Alex Barcello and Te'Jon Lucas completed their college eligibility, while Gavin Baxter and Richard Harward have one additional year of eligibility remaining. While Richard Harward is expected to end his athletic career, Gavin Baxter entered the transfer portal on April 19. Jeremy DowDell, Nate Hansen, Hunter Erickson, Seneca Knight, and Caleb Lohner also entered the transfer portal during March and April. Additionally, Gideon George entered the transfer portal after declaring for the NBA draft. However, he later withdrew his name from the transfer portal stating, "Finishing what we started."

Incoming transfers 
On May 7, 2022 Rudi Williams committed to BYU with one year of eligibility remaining as a graduate transfer. Williams narrowed his choices to 8 schools which included San Diego State, UConn, Cal, Butler, Xavier, Wichita State and Mason before selecting BYU. Jaxson Robinson announced on Twitter on June 16 that he had committed to BYU. Since Robinson entered the transfer portal after May 1, he required—and received—a waiver to play during the 2022–23 season. After previously committing to St Bonaventure in early June, Noah Waterman announced he would be transferring to BYU on June 27. Waterman previously played basketball at Detroit Mercy and Niagara. On June 30, it was reported that Tredyn Christensen had committed to play for BYU as a preferred walk-on. He previously played two years at Snow College and most recently at Division II Chaminade University of Honolulu. On July 6, the head coach at Umpqua Community College, Daniel Leeworthy, announced that one of his players, Nathan Webb, had committed to play at BYU. Webb will have 3 years of eligibility remaining.

Returned missionaries 
Four returned missionaries were added to the roster for the 2022–23 season. Dallin Hall, Richie Saunders, and Tanner Toolson each hold scholarship positions while Tanner Hayhurst will join as a preferred walk-on. All four players have four years of eligibility remaining.

Currently serving missionaries 
Five players are completing missionary service during the 2022–23 academic year. Townsend Tripple delayed his missionary assignment to Argentina and was part of the roster during the 2020–21 season. Jake Wahlin was part of the 2021 recruiting class and plans to  join the team for the 2023–24 season after missionary service in Lithuania. Paora Winitana was also part of the 2021 recruiting class and will start missionary service after one year on the team. Collin Chandler and Adam Stewart were part of the 2022 recruiting class.

2022 recruiting class 
Collin Chandler committed and signed with BYU on November 10, 2021. Chandler was recruited by Utah, Arizona, Stanford, and Utah State. He will go on a mission and enroll at BYU in 2024. He is the highest ranked BYU recruit since Eric Mika in 2013. Adam Stewart committed to BYU after being recruited since 7th grade. He will be a walk-on starting with the 2024–25 season after completing a mission to Paris, France. Braeden Moore committed to BYU after he had originally committed in 2021 to play at Rutgers. He was recruited by Kansas, Wisconsin, Nebraska, Arizona State, Houston, San Diego State, and Auburn. On July 29, 2022, Hao Dong committed to BYU as a walk-on and will join the team for the 2022–23 season.

Roster

Media coverage

Radio 
Greg Wrubell and Mark Durrant return to call men's basketball for the 2022–23 season. Jason Shepherd will act as the host for most games, though Ben Bagley will fill-in for Shepherd when he has women's soccer, baseball, or college basketball duties.

 Affiliates:

 BYU Radio- Flagship Station Nationwide (Dish Network 980, Sirius XM 143, KBYU 89.1 FM HD 2, TuneIn radio, and byuradio.org)
 KSL 102.7 FM and 1160 AM- (Salt Lake City / Provo, Utah and ksl.com)
 KSNA 100.7 FM - Blackfoot / Idaho Falls / Pocatello / Rexburg, Idaho (games)
 KSPZ 105.1 FM and 980 AM- Blackfoot / Idaho Falls / Pocatello / Rexburg, Idaho (coaches' shows)
 KMXD 100.5 FM- Monroe / Manti, Utah
 KSVC 980 AM- Richfield / Manti, Utah
 KDXU 94.9 FM and 890 AM- St. George, Utah

Television 
In September 2019, the West Coast Conference (WCC) agreed to a multi-year deal through the 2026–27 season with ESPN and the CBS Sports Network to broadcast numerous basketball games each year. Previously, the WCC had an agreement with ESPN, but the new agreement adds additional television coverage of basketball games through the CBS Sports Network. Games broadcast on the CBS Sports Network are carried on channel 158 on the Dish Network, channel 221 on DirecTV and channel 269 on Xfinity. Under the terms of the deal, ESPN will broadcast 17 games during the regular season and the CBS Sports Network will broadcast a minimum of 9 games. ESPN will continue to broadcast the quarterfinals, semifinals and the championship game of the WCC tournament. BYU maintains the rights to broadcast home games on BYUtv (11.1 in Salt Lake City, Utah, channel 374 on the Dish Network, and channel 4369/9403 on DirecTV). Meanwhile, Stadium broadcasts will be simulcast on KJZZ or KMYU. The broadcasts became even more important after Sinclair sold KSTU, causing Stadium to leave the Digital 3 station.

Schedule 

|-
!colspan=12 style=| Scrimmage

|-
!colspan=12 style=| Exhibition

|-
!colspan=12 style=| Non-Conference Regular Season

|-
!colspan=12 style=|  WCC Regular Season

|-
!colspan=12 style=| WCC tournament

Future opponents 
The upcoming 2023–24 season is the first season BYU will play in the Big 12. Their Big 12 conference schedule is expected to be 18 games, or two more compared to the 16 games that the WCC has scheduled for the most recent five years. For the 2023–24 season, the schedule is also expected to include the following non-conference opponents:.

 San Diego State (home)
 Utah (away)
 Big East opponent (Big East–Big 12 Battle)
 Three game MTE (multi-team event)

See also

References 

BYU Cougars men's basketball seasons
Byu
BYU Cougars men's basketball
BYU Cougars men's basketball